Something Blue is the fourth album by saxophonist Paul Horn which was originally released on the HiFi Jazz label in 1960.

Reception

The Allmusic site awarded the album 4 stars stating: "All of the music is pretty episodic with tricky frameworks and some unusual time signatures being utilized. The results are generally stimulating if rarely all that relaxed".

Track listing
All compositions by Paul Horn except as indicated
 "Dun-Dunnee" - 7:13
 "Tall Polynesian" (Paul Moer) - 8:13
 "Mr. Bond" - 8:21
 "Fremptz" (Emil Richards) - 6:03
 "Something Blue" - 7:37
 "Half and Half" - 7:51

Personnel
Paul Horn - alto saxophone, flute, clarinet
Emil Richards - vibraphone
Paul Moer - piano
Jimmy Bond - bass
Billy Higgins - drums

References

Paul Horn (musician) albums
1960 albums